"One Moment in Time" is a sentimental ballad by American singer Whitney Houston and written by Albert Hammond and John Bettis, produced by Narada Michael Walden for the 1988 Summer Olympics held in Seoul, South Korea. It was released by Arista Records on August 27, 1988, as the first single from the compilation album, 1988 Summer Olympics Album: One Moment in Time, the soundtrack to the games. The song was Houston's third number one in the UK Singles Chart, and reached number five on the US Billboard Hot 100. The song was later included on the second disc of her first greatest hits Whitney: The Greatest Hits and also on The Ultimate Collection and on the second disc of I Will Always Love You: The Best of Whitney Houston.

History

The song's melody was inspired by the timeless figure of Elvis Presley, with Hammond imagining it as being sung by Presley at the opening of the Olympics. It appeared on the album 1988 Summer Olympics Album: One Moment in Time, produced in conjunction with NBC Sports' coverage of the Seoul Olympic Games and which, in addition to Whitney Houston who sang it live at the main ceremony, also featured artists such as: The Four Tops, The Bee Gees, Eric Carmen, Taylor Dayne and the film composer John Williams.  The track is an anthem for believing in yourself against all odds as Houston asks for "One moment in time/when I'm racing with destiny/Then, in that one moment of time, I will feel eternity."

Chart performance
"One Moment in Time" was released by Arista Records on August 27, 1988, as the first single from 1988 Summer Olympics Album: One Moment in Time, the soundtrack to the Games in Seoul, South Korea. The song debuted at number 57 on the Billboard Hot 100, the issue dated September 10, 1988. Nine weeks later, it peaked at number five on the chart, the issue date of November 12, 1988, becoming Houston's tenth top 10 hit on the Hot 100, and spent 17 weeks on the chart. It also debuted on the Billboard Hot R&B/Hip-Hop Songs (formerly "Hot Black Singles") at number 78, the issue dated September 17, 1988, and six weeks later reached a peak of 22, her lowest position on the R&B chart at the time. On the issue date of November 5, 1988, the single peaked at number one on the Billboard Hot Adult Contemporary chart, making it her seventh number-one single on the chart, and stayed on the top for two weeks. It ranked number 89 on the Billboard Hot 100 Year-End chart of 1988.

Worldwide, it was a big hit. In the United Kingdom, the song entered the UK Singles Chart at number 24, the week ending date of September 24, 1988, and within four weeks of its release reached the top position, a peak it maintained for two weeks, becoming Houston's third UK number-one single. The single was certified Silver by the British Phonographic Industry (BPI) for shipments of 200,000 copies on October 1, 1988. According to The Official Charts Company, the single has sold 400,000 copies in the country. In West Germany, it debuted at number 58 on the Media Control Top 100 Singles chart, the week dated September 26, 1988, and the following week went straight into the top ten. On October 24, 1988, the fifth week of its release, the song reached number one on the chart and stayed there for two weeks, making it her second West German number-one hit. The single was certified Gold for shipments of 250,000 copies or more by the Bundesverband Musikindustrie (BVMI) in 1988. Across Europe, "One Moment in Time" was successful, topping the European Hot 100 Singles chart for five weeks. It peaked inside the top five in Austria, Belgium, Finland, Iceland, Norway, Sweden, and Switzerland, and reached top ten in France and the Netherlands. But the single became a minor hit in Oceania region, peaking at number 53 and 34 on the singles chart, in Australia and New Zealand, respectively. The song re-entered the UK Singles Chart for week ending February 18, 2012, following Houston's death.

Critical reception
Pan-European magazine Music & Media described "One Moment in Time" as "a grand ballad in a pompous production by Narada Michael Walden." Following Houston's death, Entertainment Weekly published a list of her 25 best songs and ranked it #14 because: "The Seoul Olympics needed an anthem, and Houston rose to meet the challenge with this majestic carpe diem chest-thumper. The song, a staple of sports montages, yielded one of Houston's all-time best performances at the 1989 Grammys ceremony."

Live performances
1989: Houston performed the song at the opening of the 31st Grammy Awards on February 22, 1989, where she was nominated for Best Pop Vocal Performance, Female. This performance was broadcast live on CBS and released on the videos and CD: Grammy's Greatest Moments, Vol II (1994), and Whitney: The Greatest Hits (2000). It also appears on the CD/DVD Live: Her Greatest Performances.
1990: Houston performed the song during Sammy Davis Jr.'s 60th Anniversary Celebration in Show Business, taped at the Shrine Auditorium in Los Angeles on November 13, 1989, and broadcast on ABC, February 4, 1990.
1997: Houston performed the song again at the US Open Tennis Championships: the Arthur Ashe Stadium Inauguration Ceremonies on August 25, 1997.

Music video
The video for the song does not show Houston performing the song but is a basic collage of clips from previous Olympic ceremonies. It opens with footage of Olympic games from 1924 and 1964 until the lighting of the cauldron from the 1988 games is shown which fades from black and white to color. As the song plays throughout, footage from the games in 1988 and 1984 are shown. When the chorus is sung for the last time, midway through it, scenes of the awarding from 1984 and 1988 are shown. The song video ends with the 1988 Olympic Cauldron blazing.

Track listing and formats

West Germany 12" maxi-vinyl/Maxi-CD single/UK 12" vinyl single (Version 1)
 "One Moment in Time" by Whitney Houston ― 4:42
 "Midnight Wind" by Tony Carey ― 5:03
 "Olympic Joy" (Instrumental) by Kashif ― 4:03

UK 12" vinyl single (Version 2)
 "One Moment in Time" by Whitney Houston ― 4:42
 "Olympic Joy" (Instrumental) by Kashif ― 4:03
 "Rise to the Occasion" by Jermaine Jackson & Lala ― 4:43

UK 12" vinyl single (Version 3)
 "One Moment in Time" by Whitney Houston ― 4:42
 "Love Will Save the Day" (Jellybean Remix)
 "Olympic Joy" (Instrumental) by Kashif ― 4:03

UK / Europe 7" vinyl single
 "One Moment in Time" by Whitney Houston ― 4:42
 "Olympic Joy" (Instrumental) by Kashif ― 4:03

US 7" vinyl single
 "One Moment in Time" ― 4:42
 "Love Is a Contact Sport" ― 4:16

West Germany 5" maxi-CD single
"One Moment in Time" by Whitney Houston ― 4:42
"Olympic Joy" (Instrumental) by Kashif ― 4:03
"Rise to the Occasion" by Jermaine Jackson & Lala ― 4:43
"One Moment in Time" (Instrumental) ― 4:42

JPN 3" CD single
 "One Moment in Time" by Whitney Houston ― 4:42
 "Olympic Joy" (Instrumental) by Kashif ― 4:03

Charts

Weekly charts

Year-end charts

Certifications

Personnel
 Whitney Houston: vocals, vocal arranger
 Narada Michael Walden: producer, arranger, drums
 Walter "Baby Love" Afanasieff: keyboards
 Randy "The Emperor" Jackson: Moog Source synth bass
 Robert "Bongo Bob" Smith: SP-12 percussion, drum sampling, programming
 Ren Klyce: Fairlight synthesizer
 Vernon "Ice" Black: guitar
 The London Symphony Orchestra: orchestra
 Claytoven Richardson, Jeanie Tracy, Jim Gilstrap, Karen "Kitty Beethoven" Brewington, Lynette Stephens, Rosie Gaines, Walter Hawkins: background vocals

Cover versions
"One Moment in Time" was performed live by then-11-year-old Teodora Sava in the auditions of the first edition of the Romanian children's talent show Next Star in 2013. Her performance gathered praise and positive reactions from all of the judges (who were seeing her for the first time) and online, and had 2.65 million combined YouTube views, making her well known to a wider audience in Romania and abroad. Soon after, she recorded the song in a studio.

British instrumental rock group the Shadows did a version on their 1989 album, Steppin' to the Shadows: 16 Great Tracks As Only the Shadows Can Play Them.

In 1998, Diva Jane McDonald sang Houston's version of the song from the album Jane McDonald.

Dana Winner did a cover of the song; her version has garnered more than 35 million views on YouTube.

In popular culture
Appropriately for the song's origins as an Olympic anthem, British Olympic gold medal-winning heptathlete Denise Lewis selected the song as one of her eight recordings on the BBC's Desert Island Discs in February 2012. That same month, the song featured at the beginning of the 2012 Brit Awards at London's O2 Arena in tribute to Houston who had died earlier in the month by playing the song accompanied with a 30-second-video montage of her music videos.

Dexter Darden performs the song in Season 2 Episode 10 of Saved by the Bell.

See also
List of European number-one hits of 1988
List of number-one adult contemporary singles of 1988 (U.S.)
List of number-one singles from the 1980s (UK)
List of number-one hits of 1988 (Germany)

References

External links
One Moment in Time at Discogs

1988 songs
1988 singles
1989 singles
Whitney Houston songs
European Hot 100 Singles number-one singles
UK Singles Chart number-one singles
Number-one singles in Germany
Songs written by Albert Hammond
Olympic theme songs
1980s ballads
1988 Summer Olympics
Contemporary R&B ballads
Pop ballads
Soul ballads
Songs with lyrics by John Bettis
Song recordings produced by Narada Michael Walden
NBC Sports
Arista Records singles
Gospel songs